Amos Alfred Fries (1873–1963) was a general in the United States Army and 1898 graduate of the United States Military Academy. Fries was the second chief of the army's Chemical Warfare Service, established during World War I. Fries served under John J. Pershing in the Philippines and oversaw the construction of the roads and bridges in Yellowstone National Park. He eventually became an important commander in World War I. After he retired from the Army in 1929, Fries wrote two anti-communist books. He died in 1963 and is buried in Arlington National Cemetery.

Early life
Amos Alfred Fries was born March 17, 1873, in Viroqua, Wisconsin. His family moved to Missouri after he was born and then moved to Oregon. Fries earned an appointment to the United States Military Academy and graduated there in 1898.

Military career

After graduating West Point Fries joined the Army Corps of Engineers and served in the Philippines during the Philippine–American War. During that time he saw combat under the leadership of Captain John J. Pershing, later the American Expeditionary Forces (AEF) commander during World War I. From 1914 to 1917 Fries oversaw the construction of roads and bridges in Yellowstone National Park; he gained some notoriety for that work.

Fries arrived in Europe as World War I raged, he expected to do more engineering work but was instead thrust into heading the fledgling Gas Service Section, AEF. The Gas Service Section was mostly constituted by the 1st Gas Regiment (originally the 30th Engineer Regiment (Gas and Flame)) and Fries commanded the section. He became the chief of the Overseas Division of the Chemical Warfare Service in 1919, and when William L. Sibert retired in 1919, Fries became the first peacetime overall chief of the Chemical Warfare Service the following year. He served at that post until he retired from the Army in 1929. For his work with the Chemical Warfare Service he was awarded the Distinguished Service Medal.

"Anti-communism" and chemical warfare advocacy
During the "interwar period", the Chemical Warfare Service maintained its arsenal despite public pressure and presidential wishes in favor of disarmament. Fries viewed calls for chemical disarmament as a Communist plot. As CWS chief, Fries created a secret military intelligence unit within the Chemical Warfare Service to monitor domestic subversion. Fries accused the National Council for Prevention of War (NCPW) of being a Communist front. He also leveled similar accusations at Florence Watkins, the executive secretary of the National Congress of Parent Teacher Associations. The pressure generated by Fries' accusations led to the National Congress of Parent Teacher Associations withdrawing its membership in the NCPW. The General Federation of Women's Clubs took the same action.

In 1923 Fries' office distributed a "spider chart" to "patriotic groups" across the United States. The chart intended to show that all women's societies and church groups be regarded with suspicion concerning links to radical groups and Communist leadership. The spider chart listed 21 individual women and 17 organizations, among them the Daughters of the American Revolution. Later in his life, Fries wrote two anti-communist books, Communism Unmasked, published in 1937,  and Sugar Coating Communism.

Later life and death
Fries died on December 30, 1963, and was buried at Arlington National Cemetery.

Selected publications
 Chemical Warfare (1921), co-authored with Clarence J. West
 Communism Unmasked (1937)
 Sugar Coating Communism: A Plea for God and Country, Home and Family (c. 1930)
 Sugar Coating Communism for Protestant Churches: Chart Showing Interlocking Membership of Churchmen, Socialists, Pacifists, Internationalists, and Communists (chart – 1923)

Notes

Further reading
 Fries, Amos A. "Address by Major General Amos A. Fries Chief of the Chemical Warfare Service at the Opening Exercises Army Industrial College, September 1, 1925", National Defense University, Library, accessed October 21, 2008.
 Fries, Amos A. Communism Unmasked, (Google Books), originally published 1937, Kessinger Publishing, 2007,.

External links
 Amos Alfred Fries, ArlingtonCemetery.net, an unofficial website

1873 births
1963 deaths
Burials at Arlington National Cemetery
United States Military Academy alumni
People from Viroqua, Wisconsin
American military personnel of the Philippine–American War
United States Army generals of World War I
United States Army generals
Chemical warfare
Writers from Missouri
Writers from Oregon
Writers from Wisconsin
Recipients of the Distinguished Service Medal (US Army)
Military personnel from Wisconsin
United States Army Corps of Engineers personnel